HONEY JET!! is the seventh album by Yui Horie.  It was released on July 15, 2009, as a standard edition and a limited edition.

The album achieved a peak position of tenth in the Oricon Charts, staying in the chart for five weeks.

Track listing
moment
JET!!
Secret Garden
prism
Vanilla Salt (バニラソルト)
 First ending theme song for the anime Toradora!
Spica (スピカ)
silky heart
 Second opening theme song for the anime Toradora!
Get up and Go
Peppermint Days
Love Countdown
Blue Rainy Days
Beside You (君のそばに)
Dear...

References

Yui Horie albums
2009 albums